Manju Kak is a writer. She is an author, a critic, and an art and cultural historian. She has also been a volunteer engaged in development issues and women's organizations.

Her fiction, essays, critical reviews, and articles have appeared in newspapers, journals, anthologies and magazines in India and abroad since 1990, including The Hindu, Women's Press, The Times of India, The Westview Press, Katha Prize Stories, Kali for Women, Mail Today, Toronto Review, Hong Kong Standard, Arts of Asia, Little Magazine and Canadian Feminist Studies Journal.

She has been a recipient of the Hawthornden and Charles Wallace & Ministry of Culture fellowships. She has been particularly drawn to Himalayan culture, and has researched and curated ethnographic exhibitions on the same, including ‘A Craftsman and his Craft: Iconography of Woodcarvings of Kumaon’ (1998); The Uttarakhand Development Report—Handicrafts (2003) ‘N. Roerich, Painter of the Himalayas — the Roerich Peace Pact & Banner of Peace’ (2009); and directed a documentary film They who walked Mountains the erstwhile salt routes from India to Tibet.

She has a PhD in Art History from the National Museum, New Delhi, and has been a teacher and Visiting Professor of art history, literature and cultural studies, in Delhi, the UK, and Hong Kong (Centre for Nehru Studies & Academy of Third World Studies, Jamia Millia Islamia; National Museum Institute, New Delhi; St. Stephen's College & Open Learning University, Hong Kong;  St. Columba's School, New Delhi).

She has worked as a consultant with the Ministry of Culture (50th Anniversary Celebrations) (1997–98); and  INTACH, COHANDS ( Handicraft Board). Currently she is Member in Charge in the all India Women's Conference (AIWC) established in 1927, and Trustee of the Lal Bahadur Shastri Memorial Trust. She has served on various NGO committees.

Awards
1990: Award at "Asian Voices in English" sponsored by the British Council and Hong Kong University, (Hong Kong) for "When I Return".
1992: The Katha Award for "Blessed are my Sons", India.
1995: Senior Fellowship from the Department of Culture, Government of India,
1995: Charles Wallace-British Council Award, at the University of Stirling, UK.
2003: Hawthornden Fellowship by the Heinz Foundation at Edinburgh, Scotland.

Publications
First Light in Colonelpura
Requiem for an unsung revolutionary and other stories
Nicholas Roerich: Painter of the Himalayas — Legacy & Quest
Whose Media — a Woman’s Space
Just One Life and Other Stories

References

Year of birth missing (living people)
Living people